The third season of Australian reality television series The Block, titled The Block 2010, aired on the Nine Network. Jamie Durie didn't return as host and was replaced by Scott Cam, John McGrath returned as judge & introduced new judge Neale Whitaker, premiered on Wednesday, 22 September 2010 at 7:00 pm.

After a long break, the series was revived in 2010 with a set of four apartments in the upmarket suburb of Vaucluse in Sydney being renovated and Scott Cam replacing Jamie Durie as host.

Results

Room Reveals
 Colour key:
  Indicates weekly room winner

Auction

Ratings

References

2010 Australian television seasons
3